The Airbus A380 has two full-length decks of , though the upper deck has a slightly reduced usable length of  due to the curvature of the front fuselage and the front staircase. The widths of the main deck and upper deck measure  and  respectively.

Passenger capacity varies with the seat configuration chosen by the operating airline. While the A380-800 is certified for up to 840 passengers in a one-class configuration (538 on the main deck and 330 on the upper), Airbus references a "comfortable three-class" 544-passenger configuration in their marketing material. However, only Air France has come close to that number in a three-class configuration, with 538 seats (9 First, 80 Business and 449 Economy).

Of the planes currently in service, the passenger capacity ranges from 379 (4-class layout in Singapore Airlines) to 615 passengers (2-class layout in Emirates). From late 2015, Emirates started operating planes seating 615 passengers in two classes for the Copenhagen route, the most ever seen, replacing the smaller Boeing 777. In all, 15 aircraft will use this configuration. Airbus offers 11-abreast seats for delivery in 2017.

Some airlines have speculated configuring the planes for higher seat numbers, including a one-class layout seating 840 people.

List

See also
Wide-body aircraft

References

Airbus A380
Airbus A380